Smoky is a 1946 American Western film directed by Louis King and starring Fred MacMurray. It is the second of three film adaptations of the 1926 novel Smoky the Cowhorse by Will James; others were made in 1933 and 1966.

Plot
A cowboy riding alone in Utah witnesses a stampede of wild stallions, one of whom particularly catches his eye. He returns the horse to its rightful owner, Julie Richards, owner of the Rocking R Ranch, introducing himself as Clint Barkley and asking for a job.

The wild horse, Smoky, slowly develops a relationship with Clint, but ranch foreman Jeff doesn't trust the new hired hand, who is vague and mysterious about his past. A stranger arrives named Frank and persuades a reluctant Clint to vouch for him to be hired as a wrangler.

It turns out Clint took the blame for a crime Frank committed and served eight months behind bars. Frank begins causing trouble at the ranch, mistreating Smoky and the other horses. A gambler turns up, seeking Clint's payment for a $200 debt, discovering that Frank actually lost the money and forged Clint's name on the IOU.

Frank rustles the horses and rides off. Jeff remains suspicious until Clint finally reveals that Frank is his brother. Smoky, abused again, fights off Frank and ends up killing him. Other cowboys discover the horse and sell him to a rodeo in Cheyenne. The horse's condition deteriorates and he ends up pulling a junk cart. One day Clint rides into town and Smoky recognizes him. They are reunited, and return to Julie and the ranch.

Cast
 Fred MacMurray as Clint Barkley
 Anne Baxter as Julie Richards
 Bruce Cabot as Frank Denton
 Esther Dale as Gram
 Roy Roberts as Jeff 
 J. Farrell MacDonald as Jim
 Burl Ives as Willie

Production
Parts of the film were shot in Utah: Zion National Park, Kanab Race Track, Cave Lakes, Aspen Mirror Lake, the Gap, Rockville Road, Kanab Canyon, Ogden, and Cedar Breaks. Fredonia, Arizona, Cheyenne, Wyoming, and Burbank and Saugus, California were also filming locations.

References

External links
 
 
 

1946 films
1946 Western (genre) films
20th Century Fox films
Remakes of American films
American Western (genre) films
Films about horses
Films based on children's books
Films based on Western (genre) novels
Films directed by Louis King
Films shot in Utah
Films shot in Wyoming
Films shot in Arizona
Films shot in California
Films with screenplays by Dorothy Yost
1946 drama films
1940s English-language films
1940s American films